Cheeseman is a surname, meaning a maker or seller of cheese. Over time, the name has been spelt in a variety of different ways, including Cheesman, Cheseman, Chesman, Chessman, Chiesman and Chisman. Notable people with the surname include:

 Andrea Chesman, American author of cookbooks
 Camaron Cheeseman (born 1998), American football player
 Dave Cheeseman (born 1978), British musician
 Darren Cheeseman (born 1976), Australian politician
 Ellen Cheeseman (1848–1928), painter and botanist from New Zealand
 Emma Cheeseman (1846–1927/28), painter and taxidermist from New Zealand
 Gareth Cheeseman, fictional character in the stage play "Death of a Salesman"
 Gwen Cheeseman (born 1951), American hockey player
 John Cheeseman (disambiguation), several people
 Joseph James Cheeseman (1843–1896), 12th president of Liberia
 Peter Cheeseman (1932–2010), British theatre director
 Samuel Cheeseman (1857–1942), American politician from Pennsylvania
 Thomas Cheeseman (disambiguation), several people

See also
 Mount Cheeseman, New Zealand
 Cheeseman the Game
 Chiesmans, a former London department store group

English-language surnames
Occupational surnames
English-language occupational surnames